Sathupati Prasanna Sree (born 2 September 1964) is an Indian linguist.

Career
Sree is Professor of English and Chairperson of the Board of Studies at Andhra University.
Throughout her career Sree has worked in preserving minority tribal languages and creating new writing systems for tribal languages within India.

Sree has created writing systems for the Kupia, Koya, Jatapu, Konda-dora, Gadaba, Kolam, Gondi, Savara, Kurru, Sugali, Mukhadhora, and Rana languages. She received the Nari Shakti Puraskar on International Women’s Day 2022 from President Ram Nath Kovind.

Selected works
Sree's published writings include:
 Psychodynamics of the Women in the Post Modern Literature of the East and the West
 Shades of Silence
 Woman in the Novels of Shashi Deshpande - A Study

References

1964 births
Living people
Academic staff of Andhra University
Linguists from India
Nari Shakti Puraskar winners
Andhra University alumni